Jean-Jacques Hauer or Johann Jakob Hauer (10 March 1751 – 3 June 1829)  was a German painter active in France. Hauer is known to have painted the portrait of Charlotte Corday before her execution.

Selected works 

 Oil painting, ex-voto, Blois, Blois Cathedral.
 Oil painting, Portrait du préfet du Loir-et-Cher Louis Chicoilet de Corbigny, 1829, Blois, Château de Blois
 Pastel, Charlotte Corday,  17 July 1793, Versailles, musée Lambinet
 Oil painting, Charlotte Corday,  1793, Versailles, musée Lambinet
 Oil painting, La mort de Marat, 1794, Versailles, musée Lambinet.
 Oil painting, La confession de Louis XVI par l'abbé Edgeworth, Versailles, musée Lambinet
 Oil painting, Les adieux de Louis XVI à sa famille, 20 January 1793, Paris, Carnavalet Museum

References

1751 births
1829 deaths
German expatriates in France
German male painters